Léon Poirier (25 August 1884 – 27 June 1968) was a French film director, screenwriter and film producer best known for his silent films from 1913 onwards. He directed some 25 films between 1913 and 1949. His most famous film today is Verdun: Visions of History, a drama-documentary depicting the World War I Battle of Verdun. His later films adopted a form of poetic realism influenced by pictorialist photography.

Life
Poirier was the nephew of Berthe Morisot. He began his career in the theatre, as secretary of the Théâtre du Gymnase. Following a serious accident, he withdrew from theatrical productions and accepted a contract from Gaumont to make a film. In 1914 with the outbreak of war, he joined the army and became a lieutenant in the artillery, even though his accident exempted him from duty.

At the end of the conflict he returned to filmmaking, creating a large number of films in the silent era, but reducing his output after the advent of sound. Most of these works adopted a form of pictorialist naturalism.

In 1928 Poirier completed Verdun: Visions of History, a dramatized documentary about the battle. The film was shot on site of the carnage. Poirier utilised, ten years after the conflict, the battlefield and the ruins of the forts of Vaux and Douaumont. The performers were French and German veterans and a few professional actors.

He directed his last film in 1947 and retired to Urval where he died in 1968.

Filmography 
 1913: Cadette
 1914: Le Trèfle d'argent
 1914: Le Nid
 1914: Ces demoiselles Perrotin
 1914: L'Amour passe
 1919: Âmes d'Orient
 1920: Narayana
 1920: Le Penseur
 1921: L'Ombre déchirée
 1921: Le Coffret de jade
 1922: Jocelyn
 1923: Geneviève
 1923: The Courier of Lyon
 1924: La Brière
 1926: La Croisière noire
 1928: La Croisière jaune
 1928: Verdun: Visions of History (Verdun: Visions d'Histoire)
 1930: Caïn, aventures des mers exotiques, co-directed by Emil-Edwin Reinert
 1933: La Croisière jaune, co-directed by André Sauvage
 1933: La Voie sans disque
 1936: The Call of Silence 
 1937: Sœurs d'armes
 1940: Brazza ou l'épopée du Congo
 1943: Jeannou
 1949: La Route inconnue

See also
1913 in film

References

External links

1884 births
1968 deaths
French film directors
French film producers
French male screenwriters
20th-century French screenwriters
Silent film directors
Writers from Paris
20th-century French male writers